A list of films produced in Argentina in 1991:

External links and references
 Argentine films of 1991 at the Internet Movie Database

1991
Argentine
Films